Elections to the Baseball Hall of Fame for 1955 followed a system established for odd-number years in 1953.
The eligibility of retired players was extended; previously, a player could not be on the BBWAA ballot if he had retired more than 25 years prior. The ballot could now include those who had been retired for up to 30 years.

The Baseball Writers' Association of America (BBWAA) voted by mail to select from recent major league players and elected four: Joe DiMaggio, Gabby Hartnett, Ted Lyons, and Dazzy Vance. The Veterans Committee met in closed sessions to consider executives, managers, umpires, and earlier players. It selected two players, Frank Baker and Ray Schalk. A formal induction ceremony was held in Cooperstown, New York, on July 25, 1955, with Commissioner of Baseball Ford Frick presiding.

BBWAA election
The BBWAA was authorized to elect players active in 1925 or later, but not after 1949. All 10-year members of the BBWAA were eligible to vote.

Any candidate receiving votes on at least 75% of the ballots would be honored with induction to the Hall. Votes were cast for 65 players; a total of 251 ballots were cast, with 189 votes required for election. A total of 2,391 individual votes were cast, an average of 9.53 per ballot.

The four candidates who received 75% of the vote and were elected are indicated in bold italics; candidates who have since been elected in subsequent elections are indicated in italics.

Voting patterns
When there is an influx of qualified candidates, like there were for many years after the Hall was opened, voters tend to spread their votes out more. Joe DiMaggio's 88.8% is not an aberration of the time, and a player of his caliber would probably receive over 95% if voted on today (Ripken, Gwynn, Henderson, etc.).
The only player who received at least 15% of the vote and has not, as of 2019, been elected is Hank Gowdy, at 35.9%. Gowdy fared reasonably well in these elections, primarily because of his defensive ability. However, as time passes, voters generally tend to focus more on offensive statistics. This may be the reason why Gowdy hasn't been elected and players like Arky Vaughan and Chuck Klein, with much lower vote totals, have.
Dickie Kerr's 10% vote total is very surprising in retrospect, especially considering his four years in the majors should have made him ineligible. His success is attributed to being one of the "clean" Sox of the 1919 World Series.

References

External links
1955 Election at www.baseballhalloffame.org

Baseball Hall of Fame balloting
Hall of Fame balloting